Cucullus may refer to:

 a Latin word referring to a hood of a garment, as in cucullus non facit monachum (The hood does not make the monk)
 a substructure of the valva, a structure in male insects that is used to hold the female during copulation
 a hood over the head of Ricinulei arachnids
 a synonym for Conus, the cone snails, a genus of predatory sea snails

See also 
Colpoda cucullus, a ciliate
 Trochoidea cucullus, a species of air-breathing land snail
 Cuculus, a bird genus

Ricinulei
Insect anatomy